Mike Brumley may refer to:
Mike Brumley (catcher) (1938–2016), former catcher in Major League Baseball 
Mike Brumley (infielder) (born 1963), his son, former utility player in Major League Baseball